The Spanish presidential transition is a rarely used term outside of Spanish politics due to the character of parliamentary monarchy that the country has. However, because the Prime Minister of Spain is officially known as the "President of the Government of Spain", this change of power is referred to in the country as a presidential transition. This is because when the first executive branch appeared in representation of the monarch, it was called to the head of the government, President of the Council of Ministers.

Election

In Spain, the President is elected not by the people but for the Congress of the Deputies. In the General Elections, the different parties present a closed list of candidates to the Congress and people vote for each party and the full list. Normally, each party has his own candidate to presidency and this is normally, the leader of the closed list and the party. When the results come out, each party (if it has enough votes) wins seats (Escaños) on the Congress in proportion to the number of votes.

Following the general election of the Cortes Generales (Cortes), and other circumstances provided for in the constitution, the king meets with and interviews the leaders of the parties represented in the Congress of Deputies, and then consults with the Speaker of the Congress of Deputies (officially, Presidente de Congreso de los Diputados de España, who, in this instance, represents the whole of the Cortes Generales and was himself elected from within the Congress to be the Speaker) before nominating his candidate for the presidency, according to Section 99 of Title IV. Often minor parties form part of a larger major party, and through that membership it can be said that the king fulfills his constitutional mandate of consulting with party representatives with Congressional representation.

Title IV Government and Administration
Section 99(1) & (2)
(1) After each renewal of the Congress and the other cases provided for under the Constitution, the King shall, after consultation with the representatives appointed by the political groups with parliamentary representation, and through the Speaker of the Congress, nominate for the Presidency of the Government.
(2) The candidate nominated in accordance with the provisions of the foregoing subsection shall submit to the Congress the political program of the Government he or she intends to form and shall seek the confidence of the House.

After the Congress confirmation, the Speaker of the Congress formally reports to the king of the congressional confirmation. The king then appoints the candidate as the new President of the Government. The king's order of appointment is countersigned by the Speaker. During the inauguration ceremony performed in the presence of the king, customarily at the Salón de Audiencias in the Zarzuela Palace, the president-elect of the Government takes an oath of office over an open constitution and next to the Bible.

Presidents

Acting president
The acting president is the president that remains in office until the next president is sworn in or the current acting president is re-elected. The acting president does not have to be an outgoing president, however, his powers are limited by the Constitution.

Outgoing president
The outgoing president not presenting for re-election remains in office in a caretaker capacity until their successor is sworn in. However, his powers are limited because his official term finished the day that he convoked the elections. In this way, many decisions are reserved for an elected president.

An example of this was the 2011 general election in Spain, when outgoing president José Luis Rodríguez Zapatero did not run for re-election and he took care of the office until the elected president was sworn in.

Elected president
The term elected president is not proper to the parliamentary system because the president is not elected directly by the people but for the Congress. The term can be used unofficial if the biggest party has an absolute majority on the Congress or has the support of other party, which indicates that the candidate, although he has not been directly elected, he will overcome the congressional confirmation (Investidura).

Powers transition

After the President's confirmation in the Congress, he becomes the official President of the Government. The powers transition is merely a ceremonial act as the outgoing president is not the president or acting president anymore.

The new president normally meets the outgoing president at the Moncloa (presidential palace and headquarters of the government) and after a conversation, they go to the main door in front of the media and the outgoing president gives the president the presidential briefcase as a symbol of a transition of power. The Ministers do the same with their respective briefcases.

References

See also
 Prime Minister of Spain
 Government of Spain

Politics of Spain
Prime Ministers of Spain
Government of Spain
Cabinet formation